The red-knobbed imperial pigeon (Ducula rubricera) is a bird species in the family Columbidae. It is found in Bismarck Archipelago and the Solomon Islands archipelago. Its natural habitat is subtropical or tropical moist lowland forests.

It is classified as a species of least concern by the IUCN.

References

 BirdLife International (BLI) (2008): [2008 IUCN Redlist status changes]. Retrieved 2008-MAY-23.

red-knobbed imperial pigeon
Birds of the Bismarck Archipelago
Birds of the Solomon Islands
red-knobbed imperial pigeon
red-knobbed imperial pigeon
Taxonomy articles created by Polbot